Dakoue (also spelled Dakoueh, or Dekweh) is a village located  southwest of Mejdel Anjar, Lebanon. It is predominantly inhabited by shepherds and farmers.

Heavy Neolithic site of the Qaraoun culture

Roman temple
Behind the village there are the ruins of a Roman temple that still retains a central courtyard and a front colonnade composed of three columns. The temple was converted into a church and a chapel can be accessed via an opening in the west wall. There is a path leading from the temple to an ancient graveyard with tombs and sarcophagi. George Taylor noted the temple was aligned to the south west and classified it as a Prostylos temple. He noted that the decoration of the window, cornice and capital displayed a design unique in Lebanon.

References

External links
Photo of the temple at www.lebanon.com
Dekweh on ikamalebanon.com
Photo of Dekweh temple on the website of the American University of Beirut
Photo of Dekweh temple on the website of the American University of Beirut
Dakoueh on Localiban

Populated places in Western Beqaa District
Heavy Neolithic sites
Neolithic settlements
Archaeological sites in Lebanon
Tourist attractions in Lebanon
Ancient Roman temples
Roman sites in Lebanon